Maino was an Italian professional cycling team that existed from 1912 to 1936. Riders of the team won four editions of the Giro d'Italia. It was sponsored by Italian bicycle and motorcycle manufacturer .

References

External links

Defunct cycling teams based in Italy
1912 establishments in Italy
1936 disestablishments in Italy
Cycling teams established in 1912
Cycling teams disestablished in 1936